Umm Al Daah Khawzan (also known simply as Khawzan) is a village in Qatar located in the municipality of Al-Shahaniya. It is accessible through Dukhan Road. The closest city is the industrial hub of Dukhan. According to the Ministry of Environment, there were about six households in the village in 2014.

Etymology
There are three constituents of the village's name. The first, "umm", is Arabic for mother, and is a common prefix in Qatar when preceding a geographical description. "Daah" is the local name for a shrub, Latin name Lasiurus hirsutus, that grows abundantly in the area. Growing regularly throughout the whole of southern Qatar, it presents a slightly yellow color, and is consumed by grazing livestock.

Finally, the village derived the name "Khawzan" from a local depression called Rawdat Khawzan. In Arabic, "khazan" roughly means "reservoir". The depression was an important water reservoir for nearby settlements, being capable of storing water for months after rainy season.

Geography
Umm Al Daah Khawzan is close to Ras Abrouq on the Zekreet Peninsula, which hosts the majority of Qatar's ostriches and is part of the Al Reem Biosphere Reserve. Ostriches have occasionally wandered into the village and harassed its residents.

References

Populated places in Al-Shahaniya